Persifor Frazer Smith (November 16, 1798May 17, 1858) was a United States Army officer during the Seminole Wars and Mexican–American War. As commander of U.S. forces in California, he was one of the last military governors of the occupied territory before California became a state, and died during the Bleeding Kansas conflict.

Early life
Smith was born in Philadelphia, Pennsylvania, the son of Jonathan and Mary Ann (Frazer) Smith.  His maternal grandfather was Revolutionary War figure Persifor Frazer. General Smith is sometimes confused with his cousin, also named Persifor Frazer Smith, who was a well-known lawyer in Philadelphia.  Persifor Frazer Smith the lawyer was the son of Joseph Smith (brother of Jonathan Smith) and Mary Frazer (sister of Mary Ann Frazer). Other notable relatives include his cousin, Joseph Smith Harris.

Career
Smith served as a colonel of volunteers in the Seminole Wars from 1836 to 1838, before taking part in the Mexican–American War. He commanded the 2nd Brigade in Worth's Division at the Battle of Monterrey. He was brevetted brigadier general in September 1846 and joined Winfield Scott's army as commander of the 1st Brigade, 2nd Division. He led his brigade at the battles of Veracruz, Cerro Gordo, and Contreras. He was brevetted major general for actions at Contreras and fought in the battles for Mexico City. He served on the armistice commission and then as military governor of Mexico City.  He was an original member of the Aztec Club of 1847.

After the war, Smith commanded the Pacific Division of the U.S. Army, predecessor of the Department of the Pacific. In 1849, in his capacity as commander, he sent relief parties across the Sierra Nevada in the fall to meet the last arrivals in the emigration, saving many lives.

Smith next commanded the U.S. Army's Department of Texas in 1850–1856, wherein he selected the site for Fort Davis and issued orders for the establishment of Fort Lancaster. Smith was commander of the U.S. Army's Department of the West at Fort Leavenworth during the Bleeding Kansas conflict, which included the sacking of Lawrence by proslavery forces in May 1856, the Pottawatomie massacre by John Brown and other abolitionists at month's end, Col. E.V. Sumner's forcible dispersal of the territorial legislature on July 4, 1856, the Battle of Osawatomie in August 1856, and following the installation of a new territorial governor, the Marais des Cygnes massacre in May 1858. Obeying the request of Territorial Governor Wilson Shannon, a proslavery sympathizer in the process of being removed from office, in September 1856, General Smith sent 1,300 troops to protect the Lecompton territorial capital from a threatened attack by freesoilers.

Personal life
General Smith married his first wife, Frances Jeanette Bureau, in 1822. Their only child, Howard Smith, became a physician and surgeon.  After his first wife died in 1852, General Persifor Frazer Smith married Anne Monica Millard Armstrong, widow of Francis Wells Armstrong.

Death and legacy
Smith died at Leavenworth, Kansas, while trying to quell a disturbance three years before the start of the American Civil War. He is buried at Laurel Hill Cemetery in Philadelphia. His son, Dr. Howard Smith, who practiced medicine in New Orleans, Louisiana, most of his career, served on the staff of C.S.A. General Kirby Smith, and his stepson, Frank Crawford Armstrong, rose to brigadier general in the Confederate States Army.

References

 New International Encyclopedia, Vol XVIII, New York, Dodd, Mead and Company, 1912

1798 births
1858 deaths
Burials at Laurel Hill Cemetery (Philadelphia)
Military personnel from Philadelphia
United States military governors of California
American military personnel of the Mexican–American War
People of the Conquest of California
Members of the Aztec Club of 1847
American people of the Seminole Wars
19th-century American politicians